The 69th Street station (also known as 69th Street–Fisk Avenue station) is a local station on the IRT Flushing Line of the New York City Subway. Located at 69th Street and Roosevelt Avenue in the Woodside, Queens, it is served by the 7 train at all times.

History

Early history 
The 1913 Dual Contracts called for the Interborough Rapid Transit Company (IRT) and Brooklyn Rapid Transit Company (BRT; later Brooklyn–Manhattan Transit Corporation, or BMT) to build new lines in Brooklyn, Queens, and the Bronx. Queens did not receive many new IRT and BRT lines compared to Brooklyn and the Bronx, since the city's Public Service Commission (PSC) wanted to alleviate subway crowding in the other two boroughs first before building in Queens, which was relatively undeveloped. The IRT Flushing Line was to be one of two Dual Contracts lines in the borough, along with the Astoria Line; it would connect Flushing and Long Island City, two of Queens' oldest settlements, to Manhattan via the Steinway Tunnel. When the majority of the line was built in the early 1910s, most of the route went through undeveloped land, and Roosevelt Avenue had not been constructed. Community leaders advocated for more Dual Contracts lines to be built in Queens to allow development there.

The Flushing Line was opened from Queensboro Plaza to Alburtis Avenue (now 103rd Street–Corona Plaza) on April 21, 1917, with a local station at 69th Street.

Later years 
The city government took over the IRT's operations on June 12, 1940. The IRT routes were given numbered designations in 1948 with the introduction of "R-type" rolling stock, which contained rollsigns with numbered designations for each service. The route from Times Square to Flushing became known as the 7. On October 17, 1949, the joint BMT/IRT operation of the Flushing Line ended, and the line became the responsibility of the IRT. After the end of BMT/IRT dual service, the New York City Board of Transportation announced that the Flushing Line platforms would be lengthened to 11 IRT car lengths; the platforms were only able to fit nine 51-foot-long IRT cars beforehand. The platforms at the station were extended in 1955–1956 to accommodate 11-car trains. However, nine-car trains continued to run on the 7 route until 1962, when they were extended to ten cars. With the opening of the 1964 New York World's Fair, trains were lengthened to eleven cars. 

As part of the 2015–2019 Capital Program, the Metropolitan Transportation Authority would renovate the 52nd, 61st, 69th, 82nd, 103rd and 111th Streets stations, a project that has been delayed for several years but is slated to begin in mid-2020. Conditions at these stations were among the worst of all stations in the subway system.

Station layout

This elevated station has three tracks and two side platforms. The center track is used by the peak direction express service during rush hours. The extreme north (geographical east) end of the northbound platform is a closed work stair leading to a storage area below the tracks.

Both platforms have beige windscreens and brown canopies with green support frames and columns in the center and black, waist-high, steel fences at either ends. Black lampposts are at the un-canopied sections at regular intervals and the station signs are in the standard black name plate in white lettering.

The Brooklyn-Queens Expressway passes under the IRT Flushing Line just east of the station. There were formerly crossovers and switches between this station and 61st Street–Woodside. They were removed in 2008 and replaced with crossovers on either side of 74th Street–Broadway. The new crossovers are set up in such a way that trains going in either direction on the express track can stop at 74th Street.

Under the elevated structure of the Flushing Line directly east of the station and the Brooklyn-Queens Expressway is a track of the New York Connecting Railroad, which is used for freight by CSX.

Exits
This station has one elevated station house beneath the center of the platforms and tracks. Two staircases from the street, one at the northeast corner of 69th Street and Roosevelt Avenue and the other at the southwest corner, go up to the mezzanine, where there is a token booth at the center and a turnstile bank at either ends. Both turnstile banks lead to a waiting area/crossunder and have one staircase going up to each platform.

References

External links 

 
 Station Reporter — 7 Train
 The Subway Nut — 69th Street Pictures 
 69th Street entrance from Google Maps Street View
 Platforms from Google Maps Street View

IRT Flushing Line stations
New York City Subway stations in Queens, New York
Railway stations in the United States opened in 1917
Woodside, Queens
1917 establishments in New York City